Vince Pazzetti (January 1, 1890 – August 3, 1972) was an American football player, graduating from Lehigh University in 1912.  He later went on to be the general manager of Bethlehem Steel's Bethlehem Plant.   He was elected to the College Football Hall of Fame in 1961.

References

1890 births
1972 deaths
Lehigh Mountain Hawks football players
Wesleyan University alumni
Wesleyan Cardinals football players
College Football Hall of Fame inductees